

List of members representing the district 

The district was organized after achieving statehood in 1796

1796–1805: One, then three seats 
Tennessee began with one seat in 1796. It was apportioned two more seats in 1803. With the addition of two representatives following the 1800 Census, all three seats were elected 'General Ticket' statewide for the 8th Congress.

1873–1875: One at-large seat, among nine other districts 

No future at-large seats were apportioned after 1875.

References

 Congressional Biographical Directory of the United States 1774–present

At-large
Former congressional districts of the United States
At-large United States congressional districts